The 1947 Islington West by-election was held on 25 September 1947.

The by-election was held due to the appointment to hereditary peerage of the incumbent Labour MP, Frederick Montague.  

It was won by the Labour candidate Albert Evans, albeit with a reduced share of the poll compared to 1945.

References

Islington West by-election
Islington West,1947
Islington West by-election
Islington West by-election
Islington West,1947